This is a list of ironworks that have been established within Wales, United Kingdom. Most were established during the nineteenth century in industrialising Southeast Wales with a smaller number in Northeast Wales, West Wales and elsewhere.

South Wales
Aberaman Ironworks 
Abercraf Ironworks 
Aberdare Ironworks 
Abernant Ironworks
Abersychan Ironworks – also known as The British Ironworks
Banwen Ironworks 
Beaufort Ironworks
Bedford Ironworks or Cefn Cribwr Ironworks
Blaenavon Ironworks 
Blaendare Ironworks – see Pontypool Ironworks
Blaina Ironworks 
Brecon Ironworks 
British Ironworks - see Abersychan Ironworks
Briton Ferry Ironworks
Brynamman Ironworks
Brynna Ironworks
Bute Ironworks
Caerphilly Ironworks
Carmarthen Ironworks
Cefn Cribwr Ironworks or Bedford Ironworks
Cefn Cwsc Ironworks
Clydach Ironworks
Coalbrookvale Ironworks - see also Trostre Ironworks
Cwm Celyn Ironworks
Cwmdu Ironworks (Maesteg)
Cwm Dyar Ironworks 
Cwmavon Ironworks
Cwmbran Ironworks
Cwmffrwdoer Ironworks 
Cyfarthfa Ironworks 
Dowlais Ironworks 
Dyffryn Ironworks 
Ebbw Vale Ironworks 
Gadlys Ironworks
Garnddyrys Ironworks(despite name not an ironworks but a forge)
Garth Ironworks (Maesteg)
Golynos Ironworks 
Gwar-y-coed Ironworks
Gwendraeth Ironworks
Hirwaun Ironworks 
Ivor Works
Kilgetty Ironworks also known as Stepaside Ironworks
Llanelly Ironworks
Llechryd Ironworks, Cilgerran
Llwydcoed Ironworks also known as Aberdare Ironworks
Llynfi Ironworks 
Maesteg Ironworks 
Melincwrt Ironworks (also known as Melinycwrt Ironworks)
Millbrook Ironworks, Landore
Morriston Ironworks
Nantyglo Ironworks 
Neath Abbey Ironworks 
Oakwood Ironworks 
Old Furnace Ironworks, Llanelli
Onllwyn Ironworks 
Pembrey Ironworks
Penrhiwtyn Ironworks, Neath
Pentrebach Ironworks
Pentwyn Ironworks
Pentyrch Ironworks 
Penydarren Ironworks 
Plymouth Ironworks 
Pontardawe Ironworks
Pontnewynydd Ironworks
Pont-y-gwaith Ironworks
Pontypool Ironworks – see also known as Blaendare Ironworks, Race Ironworks
Race Ironworks – see Pontypool Ironworks
Rhymney Ironworks  
Rudry Ironworks 
Sirhowy Ironworks 
Stepaside Ironworks or Kilgetty Ironworks
Stuart Ironworks - a later name for Hirwaun Ironworks
Tintern Ironworks
Tondu Ironworks 
Tredegar Ironworks
Treforest Ironworks
Trimsaran Ironworks 
Trostre Ironworks - see also Coalbrookvale Ironworks
Union Ironworks - see Rhymney Ironworks
Varteg Ironworks or Varteg Hill Ironworks
Venallt Ironworks 
Victoria Ironworks 
Whitland Abbey Ironworks
Ynyscedwyn Ironworks 
Ynys Fach Ironworks or Ynysfach Ironworks
Ystalyfera Ironworks

North Wales
Bersham Ironworks
Brymbo Ironworks
Dewinton Ironworks or Union Ironworks, Caernarfon
Ffrwd Ironworks
Hawarden Ironworks
Mostyn Ironworks
Union Ironworks or Dewinton Ironworks, Caernarfon

References
Roberts, R. 2005 Southeast Wales Industrial Ironworks Landscapes, Year 1: the core ironworks areas (report), GGAT Ltd

Industry in Wales
 
Ironworks